Baxiangshan is a town located in Fengshun County, Meizhou City, Guangdong Province, China.

See also 
 List of township-level divisions of Guangdong

References

External links 
 Official website of the Fengshun County Government

Towns in Guangdong

Fengshun County